Shalamar Hospital, established in 1982 and named after the historical Shalimar Gardens, Lahore, is a non-profit hospital located on Shalimar Link Road, Lahore in Shalimar Town. It was founded in 1982 by a Pakistani businessman Chaudhry Ahmad Mukhtar and his family.

Besides the endowment fund, it also depends on donations and grants from other private sources in Pakistan.

Features
 Accident, Emergency and Trauma Department
 Audiometry
 Blood Bank
 Burns and Reconstructive Surgery Center
 Cafeterias
 Catheterization Laboratory
 Chest Clinic and Spirometry Center
 Coronary Care Unit
 Diabetes and Endocrine Clinic (SIDER)
 Dialysis Center
 Dispensary
 Echo cardiography
 Electro encephalography (EEG)
 ERCP and MRCP
 Esophagogastroduodenoscopy (EGD)
 Fertility Clinic
 Forensics Laboratory
 General Operation Theater (10 rooms)
 Cystoscopic Urologic Surgery
 Endoscopic Surgery
 Laparoscopic Surgery
 General Medical, Pediatric and Surgical Wards
 Intensive Care Unit
 IT Laboratory
 Labor Room
 Library
 Medical Laboratory
 Nursery and Neonatal Intensive Care Unit
 Obesity Center
 Optometry
 Pain Clinic
 Pathology Laboratory
 Pharmacy
 Physiotherapy clinic
 Private Rooms
 Radiology Center
 CT Scan
 Doppler Scans
 Fluoroscopy
 Mammography
 MRI Scan
 Waste Disposal Center

Departments
 Department of Anesthesiology and Intensive Care
 Department of Audiology
 Department of Cardiology
 Department of Cardiovascular Surgery
 Department of Clinical Pathology and Hematology
 Department of Community Medicine
 Department of Dentistry
 Department of Dermatology
 Department of ENT (Otorhinolaryngology)
 Department of Forensic Medicine and Toxicology
 Department of Gynecology and Obstetrics
 Department of Internal Medicine
 Endocrinology Division
 Gastroentrology and Hepatology Division
 Infectious Diseases Division
 Neurology Division
 Pulmonology Division
 Rheumatology Division
 Department of Nephrology and Hemodialysis
 Department of Ophthalmology
 Department of Orthopedics
 Department of Pediatrics and Neonatology
 Department of Physiotherapy
 Department of Plastic and Reconstructive Surgery
 Department of Psychiatry
 Department of Radiology
 Department of Surgery
 Bariatric Surgery Division
 Department of Urology

World Diabetes Day
In November 2016, a free medical camp, a seminar and a walk were conducted at the Shalamar Hospital on the 'World Diabetes Day'. 300 patients were examined by the hospital doctors and cholesterol, blood sugar (HbA1c) tests were done free of cost since it is a charitable hospital. These 300 patients were also provided with free medicines.

References

External links
 

Hospital buildings completed in 1982
Hospitals in Lahore
Hospitals established in 1982
Teaching hospitals in Pakistan
1982 establishments in Pakistan